Ode to Freedom may refer to:

An die Freiheit ("Ode to Freedom"), purported original phrase in Ode to Joy, lyrics that accompany the final movement of Symphony No. 9  by Beethoven
The 1989 recording of Symphony no 9. conducted by Leonard Bernstein
"Ode to Freedom", a song by ABBA on the 2021 album Voyage
"Ode to Freedom", a conjectured early title of Schiller's poem "Ode to Joy"

See also
Freiheit (disambiguation)
Freedom (disambiguation)
Ode (disambiguation)
Hymn to Freedom (disambiguation)
"Hymn to Liberty", an 1823 poem by Dionýsios Solomós